T. J. Martin (born Thomas McKay Martin Jr., September 7, 1979) is an Oscar and Emmy award winning American filmmaker. Martin's film Undefeated (2011), for which he was co-director, co-editor, and co-cinematographer, won the 2012 Oscar for Best Documentary Feature. His film LA 92 (2017), for which he was co-director and co-editor, won the 2017 Primetime Emmy for Exceptional Merit in Documentary Filmmaking.

Martin is the first film director of African-American descent to win an Oscar for a feature-length film.

Early life
Martin was born on September 7, 1979, in Seattle, Washington, to Tina Bell and Tommy Martin, singer and guitarist, respectively, of the late punk/early grunge Seattle band Bam Bam.

Martin graduated from Roosevelt High School and went on to attend Fairhaven College at Western Washington University, where he studied American Cultural Studies, graduating in 2005. While there Martin co-directed his first film, the feature documentary A Day in the Hype of America (2002), concerning the hysteria around the Y2K problem, which won Best Documentary at the 2002 Rhode Island International Film Festival.

Career

Feature films
In 2007 in Los Angeles, Martin met future directing partner Daniel Lindsay, when they collaborated on the feature documentary Last Cup: Road to the World Series of Beer Pong, directed by Lindsay and edited by Martin. The film was distributed by Morgan Spurlock's company Warrior Poets.

As co-directors, Martin and Lindsay next made the feature documentary Undefeated, which chronicles the football team of Manassas High School in Memphis, Tennessee. The film focuses on the lives of several of the players and their coach, Bill Courtney, over the course of a single season.

Undefeated premiered at the 2011 SXSW Film Festival and was purchased by The Weinstein Company for North American distribution just hours after the first screening. Released to near universal acclaim, the film went on to win the Academy Award for Best Feature Documentary in 2012. Undefeated holds a 96% rating on the review aggregator site Rotten Tomatoes.

In November, 2012 Martin was listed on Ebony Magazine’s Power 100 list. That same year he received the award for “Outstanding Achievement in Directing” from the Seattle International Film Festival.

On April 28, 2015, Martin gave a talk at TEDx on Orcas Island, Washington, titled “Reimagining America’s Culture Narrative”, in which he discussed race and diversity in the film and television industry and mass media more broadly.

In 2017, Martin and co-director/co-editor Lindsay, made the documentary feature LA 92. Composed entirely of archival footage, the film explores the days of civil unrest that followed the acquittal of four LAPD officers captured on video beating motorist Rodney King—the events commonly referred to as the 1992 Los Angeles riots. LA 92 premiered at the 2017 Tribeca Film Festival and made its broadcast premiere shortly thereafter on the National Geographic Channel. The film was named by several publications, including Rolling Stone and The Playlist, as one of the best documentaries of 2017. In June 2017, LA 92 won the Primetime Emmy Award for Exceptional Merit in Documentary Filmmaking. The film was shortlisted for Best Documentary Feature for the 90th Academy Awards and holds a 97% rating on the review aggregator site Rotten Tomatoes.

In 2021, Martin co-directed a documentary film about the life of Tina Turner, titled Tina, for HBO. More recently, he signed a first look deal with Imagine Documentaries.

Television 
In 2015, Martin co-directed a documentary special titled I Am Dying, which was produced by Joaquin Phoenix, Casey Affleck and Mary Lisio for the National Geographic Channel. The film chronicles Renee and Rita Heidtman as Renee loses her life to terminal breast cancer while her sister Rita cares for her.

In 2018, Martin co-directed "Territorio De Zaguates," episode five of the TV series Dogs.  The show is an episodic television show exploring the relationships between humans and dogs. The series premiered on Netflix in November 2018.

Other work 
Working officially as the directing duo Martin + Lindsay, Martin and Lindsay have continued their work across various platforms including short films, television, and commercial work. Their short film My Favorite Picture of You (2014) screened at numerous film festivals, was featured on The Atlantic and Vice, chosen as a Vimeo Staff Pick, and nominated for a Webby Award.

Martin and Lindsay have co-directed television commercials for clients that include Starbucks, Comcast, Gatorade, Facebook, Toyota, Prudential Financial, Hallmark Cards, the United Negro College Fund, Honey Maid, Google and the New York Times. The “This Is Wholesome” campaign, directed for Honey Maid, garnered both controversy and praise for its portrayal of parents and their children that include a single father, an interracial couple, and a gay couple. In 2020, Martin and Lindsay's "The Truth is Worth It" campaign for the New York Times swept the commercial awards circuit and nabbed a Clio and two Grand Prix Lions for Best Film and Film Craft at Cannes Lions.

Awards

References

External links

Davy Rothbart Interviews T.J. Martin for Grantland

Living people
African-American film directors
American film directors
Directors of Best Documentary Feature Academy Award winners
1979 births
21st-century African-American people
20th-century African-American people